Sonja Ndahafa Smith (born 3 April 1990) is Namibian Investigative journalist. She has reported and investigated sensitive political stories including the Caprivi treason trial case.

Early life and career
Smith was born to Kwanyama and Ngandjera parents in 1990, just after the Independence of Namibia. She began working for The Villager in 2013 as a Columnist. 
In October 2014, she joined another Namibian newspaper, Confidentè where she reported on news leads, as well as human interest features and court stories. Smith also focused on the unfolding Caprivi treason trial.

In October 2015, Smith joined the Windhoek Observer which as a political journalist where she rose to prominence key investigate stories in the country.

Freelancing
In 25 June 2018, Smith started freelancing for The Namibian. Her first freelancing article was when she broke a secretive deal between the Namibian government which was without approval and knowledge of treasury.
The deal was reversed after Smith’s article the next day by Namibia’s finance minister- Calle Schlettwein on 26 June 2018.

References

21st-century Namibian women writers
Living people
1990 births
People from Windhoek
Namibian journalists
21st-century journalists
Namibian women journalists